Shurtleff is an English surname. Notable people with the surname include:

 Arthur Shurtleff (1870–1957), American urban planner
 Bert Shurtleff (1897–1967), National Football League player in the 1920s
 Edward D. Shurtleff (1863–1936), American jurist and politician
 Mark Shurtleff (born 1957), former attorney general of Utah
 Michael Shurtleff (1920–2007), actor and casting director
 Nathaniel B. Shurtleff (1810–1874), politician and 20th mayor of Boston, Massachusetts
 William Lewis Shurtleff (1864–1954), attorney for Harry Kendall Thaw
 William Shurtleff (born 1941), American writer about soy foods

See also 
 Shurtleff College, a college in Alton, Illinois

English-language surnames